A Declaration of Love is a 1977 Soviet romance film directed by Ilya Averbakh.

Plot 
The main character is a talented, but timid writer Filippok, together with his country, is going through the difficult years of revolution, devastation and war. Adversity helps him to overcome the unrequited and devoted love for the widow of the commissar Zinochka, who manages his career in a businesslike manner, not hesitating to start romances with other men. Filippok will describe his life story in a book, which at the end of days will be presented to a terminally ill, but still beloved wife with gratitude for the experience.

Cast 
 Ewa Szykulska as Zinochka  
 Yuri Bogatyryov as Filippok
 Kirill Lavrov as Gladishev
 Angelina Stepanova as Zinochka in old age
 Bruno Frejndlikh as Filippok in old age
 Anatoli Kovalenko as investigator
 Yuri Goncharov as sailor
 Nikolai Ferapontov as blue-eyed man
 Svetlana Kryuchkova as bride
 Ivan Bortnik as Kroykov
 Lyudmila Arinina as Serafima Petrovna
 Igor Dmitriev as passenger on the ship

References

External links 
 

1977 films
1970s Russian-language films
Soviet romance films
Films directed by Ilya Averbakh
Lenfilm films
Films based on Russian novels
1970s romance films